The 1989–90 Yugoslav Cup was the 42nd season of the top football knockout competition in SFR Yugoslavia, the Yugoslav Cup, also known as the "Marshal Tito Cup" (Kup Maršala Tita), since its establishment in 1946. In total, 5,378 clubs across SFR Yugoslavia took part in the competition.

First round
In the following tables winning teams are marked in bold; teams from outside top level are marked in italic script.

† Match was replayed after the previous one was declared void. In the first match, Guber Srebrenica won on penalties 3–2 after 1–1 in extra time.

Second round

Quarter-finals

Semi-finals

Final

See also
1989–90 Yugoslav First League
1989–90 Yugoslav Second League

External links
1989–90 cup season details at Rec.Sport.Soccer Statistics Foundation
1990 cup final details at Rec.Sport.Soccer Statistics Foundation
full match

References 

Yugoslav Cup seasons
Cup
Yugo